Philippe de Croÿ, 3rd Duke of Aarschot, 4th Prince of Chimay, Count of Porcean (Valenciennes, 10 July 1526Venice, 11 December 1595), was Stadtholder of Flanders, and inherited the estates of the ancient and wealthy family of Croÿ. Becoming a soldier, he was made a Knight of the Order of the Golden Fleece by Philip II, king of Spain, and was afterwards employed in diplomatic work.

Life
He was the second son of Philippe II de Croÿ (1496–1549) and Anna de Croÿ (1501–1539).
After the death of his elder brother Charles II de Croÿ in 1551, he became 3rd Duke of Aarschot, 4th Prince of Chimay and 4th Count of Beaumont.

He took part in the troubles in the Netherlands, and in 1563 refused to join William the Silent and others in their efforts to remove Cardinal Granvelle from his post. This attitude, together with Aarschot's devotion to the Roman Catholic Church, which he expressed by showing his delight at the Massacre of St. Bartholomew, led Philip of Spain to regard him with still greater favor, which, however, was withdrawn in consequence of Aarschot's ambiguous conduct when welcoming the new governor, John of Austria (Don Juan de Austria), to the Netherlands in 1576.

In spite, however, of his being generally distrusted by the inhabitants of the Netherlands, he was appointed governor of the citadel of Antwerp when the Spanish troops withdrew in 1577. After a period of vacillation he deserted Don John towards the end of that year.

Jealous of the Prince of Orange, he was then the head of the party which induced the Archduke Matthias (afterwards emperor) to undertake the sovereignty of the Netherlands, and soon afterwards was appointed Stadtholder of Flanders by the state council. 
A strong party, including the burghers of Ghent, distrusted the new stadtholder and Aarschot, who was taken prisoner during a riot at Ghent, was only released on promising to resign his office.

He then sought to regain the favor of Philip of Spain, and having been pardoned by the king in 1580 again shared in the government of the Netherlands; but he refused to serve under the count of Fuentes when he became governor-general in 1594, and retired to Venice, where he died in December 1595.

Family

Philip III married on 24 January 1558, to Johanna Henriette van Halewyn, daughter of Jean III de Halewyn, Vicomte de Nieuwpoort and Jossyne de Lannoy. They had 3 children:
Charles III de Croÿ (1560–1612), Duke of Aarschot, married 1) Marie de Brimeu and 2) Dorothée de Croy-Havré. No issue.
Anne de Croÿ (1563–1635), married Charles de Ligne, 2nd Prince of Arenberg.
Margareth de Croÿ (1568–1614), married 1) Pierre de Henin Bossu and 2) Wratislaw of Fürstenberg.

After the death of his first wife, on 1 May 1582 he married Jeanne de Blois-Trélon († 1605), daughter of Louis II de Blois, Seigneur de Trélon, and Charlotte d'Humières.

References

Attribution

1526 births
1595 deaths
People from Valenciennes
Flemish nobility
Philippe
Knights of the Golden Fleece
Dutch people of the Eighty Years' War (Spanish Empire)
Recipients of Spanish royal pardons